Münchhausen or  Munchausen   may refer to:
Baron Munchausen (1720–1797), a German nobleman whose adventurous life was later fictionalized in literature and film
Baron Munchausen's Narrative of his Marvellous Travels and Campaigns in Russia, a novel written about Baron Munchausen by Rudolf Erich Raspe
, a German noble family
Münchhausen (surname), a German surname
Münchhausen am Christenberg, a German town
Munchhausen, Bas-Rhin, a commune in Bas-Rhin, France
14014 Münchhausen, a main belt asteroid  
Münchhausen (1943 film), a German fantasy-comedy film
Munchausen (2013 film), an American silent short horror film

See also
 Freiherr von Münchhausen (disambiguation)
Munchausen syndrome, a psychiatric disorder named after Baron Münchausen
Munchausen syndrome by proxy
Munchausen by Internet
Münchhausen trilemma in epistemology

Meet the Baron, 1933 MGM comedy featuring Baron Von Munchausen
The Adventures of Baron Munchausen, 1988 movie co-written and directed by Terry Gilliam